Serbian Handball Cup is the nationwide cup tournament for men's handball teams in Serbia.

It succeeded in 1992 to the Yugoslavia Cup and became the FR Yugoslavia Cup then the Serbia and Montenegro Cup in 2003 and finally the Serbia Cup since 2006.

Winners
Including FR Yugoslavia, Serbia and Montenegro and Serbia

Titles by club

External links
Handball Federation of Serbia

Handball competitions in Serbia